= 1977 Marshallese status referendum =

30 July 1977
- Be it resolved that the Marshall Islands should pursue their future political status separate and apart from the other districts of the Trust Territory.

Results
Choice	Votes	%
Yes	4,763	62.39%
No	2,871	37.61%

A referendum on holding separate negotiations on their future status was held in the Marshall Islands part of the Trust Territory of the Pacific Islands on 30 July 1977. The proposal was approved by 62% of voters.

== Results ==
Voters were asked the question "Be it resolved that the Marshall Islands should pursue their future political status separate and apart from the other districts of the Trust Territory. Yes or no."

Choice	Votes	%
For	4,763	62.39
Against	2,871	37.81
Invalid/blank votes		–
Total	7,634	100
Source: Highlights
